The Appalachian String Band Music Festival (often referred to simply as "Clifftop") is a weeklong gathering of thousands of string band musicians and their friends from across the country and around the world, who each year since 1990 have assembled near the New River Gorge in West Virginia in late July/early August to celebrate the evolving tradition of old-time music and the community of people who keep it thriving by preserving and contributing to that tradition.

History
Though the Festival offers contests (traditional band, neo-traditional band, fiddle, old-time banjo, and flatfoot dancing), square dancing, several concerts and workshops, and other organized activities such as yoga, basket making, and hymn singing, the heart and soul of the Festival is found in the campsites, where old time music provides a foundation for all kinds of straight-off-the-strings acoustic music (including Americana, cajun, Celtic, swing, bluegrass, Dawg, and even reggae), which in turn often spontaneously generate impromptu dancing and other festivities by the people gathered within earshot.

Though the Festival officially starts the Wednesday before the first full weekend in August, the grounds start filling up the weekend before with well-adorned campsites, many of which have music being played through the night.  One of the Festival's unique features is the Neo-Traditional Band Contest on Friday, in which highest scores are given to bands that creatively extend the old time music tradition into other musical voices, instrumentation, and styles.

Over the years, the Festival has been frequented by accomplished Nashville musicians like John Hartford and Tim O'Brien and Leftover Salmon jam band leader Vince Hermann, legendary old time Appalachian musicians like Melvin Wine and Lester McCumbers, leading "second generation" old time musicians like Mike Seeger, Bruce Molsky, Rafe Stefanini, Brad Leftwich, and Ira Bernstein, and the youngest generation of old time musicians like Jake Krack.

The Festival takes place each summer at Camp Washington-Carver, in Clifftop, Fayette County, West Virginia, United States and is sponsored by the West Virginia Division of Culture and History.

Past winners

See also
List of bluegrass music festivals

References
    3. Notes from a first timer, 2011

4. https://oldtime-central.com/clifftop-a-beginners-guide/

External links
Official site
Sounds from Clifftop (National Public Radio, 2005)
Ukrainian exchange student's prize-winning visit to Clifftop
 Podcast featuring classical musicians Robin Kearton and Tom Faux talking about their transcendent experiences at Clifftop and funding threats in 2017
 https://www.register-herald.com/news/a-day-at-the-appalachian-string-band-festival-starts-with/article_523cf1b3-9cda-5bd4-874b-72075bc896b1.html

Video
Interviews and music during Clifftop, 2015
2008 feature about Clifftop by WV Public Broadcasting
Impromptu Neo-trad campsite jam  
Miscellaneous campsite jams, 2015
 2015 Traditional Band Contest winners
2015 Neo Traditional Band Contest winners

Music festivals in West Virginia
Old-time music festivals
Tourist attractions in Fayette County, West Virginia
Recurring events established in 1990
Folk festivals in the United States
Appalachian music